The 1978 Washington Star International was a men's tennis tournament and was played on outdoor clay courts. The event was part of the 1978 Grand Prix circuit. It was the 10th edition of the tournament and was held in Washington, D.C. from July 17 through July 23, 1978. First-seeded Jimmy Connors won his second singles title at the event after 1976.

Finals

Singles
 Jimmy Connors defeated  Eddie Dibbs 7–5, 7–5
 It was Connors' 6th singles title of the year and the 67th of his career.

Doubles
 Arthur Ashe /  Bob Hewitt defeated  Fred McNair /  Raúl Ramírez 6–3, 6–3

References

External links
 ATP tournament profile
 ITF tournament edition details

Washington Open (tennis)
Washington Star International
Washington Star International
Washington Star International